Aquamarine is a color that is a light tint of spring green, in between cyan and green on the color wheel. It is named after the mineral aquamarine, a gemstone mainly found in granite rocks. The first recorded use of aquamarine as a color name in English was in 1598.

See also 
 List of colors

References 

Quaternary colors
Shades of cyan
Shades of green